Jimmy Ponder (May 10, 1946 – September 16, 2013) was an American jazz guitarist.

Career
When Ponder's brother entered the military, he left his guitar, and Ponder picked it up. In his early teens he received lessons from the guitarist in a band for which he sang doo-wop. He was drawn to the jazz guitar he heard on the radio. While playing in a rhythm and blues band, he occasionally inserted a jazz solo. He considered hearing guitarist Thornel Schwartz an important part of his life, when Schwartz was playing with organist Jimmy McGriff. He was impressed by Pat Martino when he saw Martino in the Jack McDuff band. He also cited as influences George Benson, Kenny Burrell, and Rene Thomas, though none surpassed the impact of seeing Wes Montgomery.

He learned the guitar solo from "Daily Double" (Quaker Town), the first 45 rpm single released by Charles Earland. When Earland performed in Pittsburgh, he invited Ponder to sit-in with the band and liked what he heard. Earland promised Ponder he could become a member of the band after he finished high school. Six months after graduating, he was hired by Earland.

He began playing with Earland at 17 and in the following years with Lou Donaldson, Houston Person, Donald Byrd, Stanley Turrentine, and Jimmy McGriff. He moved to Philadelphia and later New York City in the 1970s and recorded extensively as a leader. Since the late 1980s, he frequently returned to his hometown to perform with his trio of two other Pittsburgh musicians, Gene Ludwig and Roger Humphries. Ponder's highest charting release was Somebody's Child, which reached No. 3 on the JazzWeek airplay chart in 2007.

Ponder died of lung cancer in Pittsburgh at the age of 67 in September 2013.

Discography

As leader 
 While My Guitar Gently Weeps (Cadet, 1974)
 Illusions (ABC Impulse!, 1976)
 White Room (ABC Impulse!, 1977)
 All Things Beautiful (LRC, 1978)
 Seven Minds (America, 1979) – released in France only
 Ponder'n (51 West, 1981)
 Down Here on the Ground (Milestone, 1984)
 So Many Stars (Milestone, 1985)
 Mean Streets – No Bridges (Muse, 1987)
 Jump (Muse, 1989) – recorded in 1988
 Come On Down (Muse, 1991) – recorded in 1990
 To Reach a Dream (Muse, 1991) – recorded in 1988–89
 Jimmy Ponder: Sonny Lester Collection (LRC, 1991) – compilation
 Soul Eyes (Muse, 1995)– recorded in 1991
 Something to Ponder (Muse, 1996)– recorded in 1994
 James Street (HighNote, 1997)
 Steel City Soul (32 Jazz, 1998) – compilation of Muse material
 Guitar Christmas (HighNote, 1998)
 Ain't Misbehavin'  (HighNote, 2000) – recorded in 1998
 Thumbs Up (HighNote, 2001)
 Alone (HighNote, 2003) – recorded in 2000
 What's New (HighNote, 2005) – recorded in 2002
 Somebody's Child (HighNote, 2007)
 Live at 'The Other End'  (Explore, 2007) – live recorded in 1982

As sideman 

With Hank Crawford and Jimmy McGriff
 Soul Survivors (Milestone, 1986)
 Steppin' Up (Milestone, 1987)
 On the Blue Side (Milestone, 1990) – recorded in 1989

With Lou Donaldson
 1967: Mr. Shing-A-Ling (Blue Note, 1968)
 1968: Say It Loud! (Blue Note, 1969)

With Charles Earland
 Boss Organ (Choice, 1966)
 Soul Crib (Choice, 1969)
 Smokin' (Muse, 1977)
 Mama Roots (Muse, 1977)
 Infant Eyes (Muse, 1978)

With Richard Groove Holmes
 Blues All Day Long (Muse, 1988)
 Hot Tat (Muse, 1991)

With Etta Jones
 Ms. Jones to You (Muse, 1976)
 My Mother's Eyes (Muse, 1977)

With Jimmy McGriff
 The Main Squeeze (Groove Merchant, 1974)
 Stump Juice (Groove Merchant, 1975)
 Tailgunner (LRC, 1977)
 City Lights (JAM, 1981)
 Movin' Upside the Blues (JAM, 1982)
 Skywalk (Milestone, 1984)

With Houston Person
 Stolen Sweets (Muse, 1976)
 Wild Flower (Muse, 1977)

With others
 Rusty Bryant, Wild Fire (Prestige, 1972) – recorded in 1971
  Donald Byrd, Fancy Free (Blue Note, 1969)
 Andrew Hill, Grass Roots (Blue Note, 1968)
 Johnny Hodges, Rippin' & Runnin' (Verve, 1969) – recorded in 1968
  Willis Jackson, In the Alley (Muse, 1977) – recorded in 1976
 Clifford Jordan, Inward Fire (Muse, 1978) – recorded in 1977
 Jack McDuff, The Fourth Dimension (Cadet, 1974)
 John Patton That Certain Feeling, (Blue Note, 1968)
 Sonny Phillips, My Black Flower (Muse, 1976)
 Shirley Scott, Superstition (Cadet, 1973)
  Lonnie Smith, Mama Wailer (Kudu, 1971)
 Joe Thomas, Joy of Cookin' (Groove Merchant, 1972)
 Mickey Tucker, Triplicity (Xanadu, 1976) – recorded in 1975
 Stanley Turrentine, Common Touch (Blue Note, 1969) – recorded in 1968
 Joe Lee Wilson, Come and See (Explore, 2007)

References

External links
 Pittsburgh Music History

2013 deaths
1946 births
20th-century American guitarists
American jazz guitarists
American male guitarists
Guitarists from Pennsylvania
Jazz musicians from Pennsylvania
Musicians from Pittsburgh
HighNote Records artists
Impulse! Records artists
Milestone Records artists
Muse Records artists
20th-century American male musicians
American male jazz musicians